Kulukasovo (Qoloqas) is a rural locality (a village) in Askarovsky Selsoviet, Abzelilovsky District, Bashkortostan, Russia. The population was 77 as of 2010. There are 3 streets.

Geography 
Kulukasovo is located 11 km southwest of Askarovo (the district's administrative centre) by road. Yarlykapovo is the nearest rural locality.

References 

Rural localities in Abzelilovsky District